The 1966 Canada Cup took place 11–14 November at the Tokyo Yomiuri Country Club in Inagi, Tokyo, Japan. It was the 14th Canada Cup event, which became the World Cup in 1967. The tournament was a 72-hole stroke play team event with 36 teams. These were the same teams that had competed in 1965 with the addition of South Korea and Thailand, but without Egypt, Monaco and Morocco. Each team consisted of two players from a country. The combined score of each team determined the team results. The American team of Jack Nicklaus and Arnold Palmer won by five strokes over the South African team of Harold Henning and Gary Player. The individual competition was won by the Canadian George Knudson, who won at the second hole of a sudden-playoff over the Japanese Hideyo Sugimoto.

Teams

Source

Scores
Team

International Trophy

Knudson and Sugimoto contested a sudden-death playoff. Knudson won with a birdie 2 at the second extra hole.

Source

References

World Cup (men's golf)
Golf tournaments in Japan
Canada Cup
Canada Cup
Canada Cup